The 2012 NCAA Division III football season, part of the college football season organized by the NCAA at the Division III level in the United States, began in August 2012, and concluded with the NCAA Division III Football Championship, also known as the Stagg Bowl, in December 2012 at Salem Football Stadium in Salem, Virginia. The Mount Union Purple Raiders won their eleventh Division III championship by defeating the St. Thomas (MN) Tommies, 28−10.

The Gagliardi Trophy, given to the most outstanding player in Division III football, was awarded to Scottie Williams, running back from Elmhurst (IL).

Conference changes and new programs

Conference standings

Conference champions

Postseason
The 2012 NCAA Division III Football Championship playoffs were the 40th annual single-elimination tournament to determine the national champion of men's NCAA Division III college football. The championship Stagg Bowl game was held at Salem Football Stadium in Salem, Virginia for the 20th time.

Qualification
Twenty-four conferences met the requirements for an automatic ("Pool A") bid to the playoffs. Besides the NESCAC, which does not participate in the playoffs, two conferences (the SAA and UAA) had no Pool A bid, neither meeting the seven-member requirement.

Schools not in Pool A conferences were eligible for Pool B. The number of Pool B bids was determined by calculating the ratio of Pool A conferences to schools in those conferences and applying that ratio to the number of Pool B schools. The 24 Pool A conferences contained 214 schools, an average of 8.9 teams per conference. Fifteen schools were in Pool B, enough for one bid.

The remaining seven playoff spots were at-large ("Pool C") teams.

Playoff bracket

* Overtime

See also
2012 NCAA Division I FBS football season
2012 NCAA Division I FCS football season
2012 NCAA Division II football season

References